Puerto del Rey Marina is a marina in Fajardo, Puerto Rico.

General description
Completed in 1988 and then re-done in 2014, Puerto del Rey Marina is operating at near its capacity of nearly 1,000 wet slips on concrete fixed piers and over 750 dry-stack spaces for smaller boats three-high, with extra spaces along piers and at anchor for transient boats.

Open year-round, the marina's busiest boating season is from October through April. Boats range in size from 30 feet up to 150-foot yachts.

In 2021, the marina's investment in boat forklift machines help it compete with other marinas.

See also

Club Deportivo del Oeste
Club Náutico de Ponce

References

External links
 Official Website Puerto del Rey Marina

1988 establishments in Puerto Rico
Buildings and structures completed in 1988
Fajardo, Puerto Rico
Marinas in the United States
Ports and harbors of Puerto Rico
Yacht clubs in Puerto Rico